The Bridge of Lies is a legendary pedestrian bridge located in the center of the Transylvanian city of Sibiu in central Romania. There are many legends surrounding the bridge because of its name. It is the first cast iron bridge built in Romania.

Located in the Lesser Square of Sibiu, the bridge crosses Strada Ocnei to connect the Lesser Square to the Huet Square.

Legends 
The Bridge of Lies has many legends surrounding it because of its name. The most popular one has it that the bridge will collapse when someone tells a lie while standing on it. Another legend says that the bridge was often crossed by merchants who were trying to fool their clients. The ones who were caught were tossed off the bridge. According to another legend, the bridge was a meeting place for boys attending the military academy and their girlfriends. The boys wouldn't show up, leaving their girlfriends wait until realizing they have been lied to. One legend also has it that the bridge was often crossed by young lovers who swore each other eternal love. The girls also swore that they were virgin, which often turned out to be a lie after the couples got married. As a punishment, they were thrown off the bridge, since it was the place where they had lied to their lovers.

Despite all the legends, its name has a different origin. The bridge was initially called Liegenbrücke, German for lying bridge (lying as in "to lie down"), which sounds very similar to Lügenbrücke, meaning "bridge of lies". The legends have helped the latter spread among the city's people, which is how the bridge came to get its current name.

Design and architecture 
The bridge is sustained by four arches made of cast iron. They are decorated with Neo-Gothic motives. On the southernmost arch stands the coat of arms of Sibiu, while on the northernmost one stand the inscriptions 1859 and Friedrichshütte respectively, the latter being the name of the foundry that delivered a part of the bridge's components.

The rails are made out of eight panels with circular shapes and Gothic decorations.

Gallery

See also 
 Bridge of Sighs – another bridge with legends regarding its name
 Eyes of Sibiu
 Council Tower of Sibiu
 Sibiu Lutheran Cathedral

References 

Buildings and structures in Sibiu
Historic monuments in Sibiu County
Bridges completed in 1860
Bridges in Romania